American singer Faith Evans has appeared in numerous music videos.

Music videos

1990s

2000s

2010s

Guest appearances

References

Videographies of American artists